Melica subflava, is a species of grass that is endemic to China.

Description
The species is perennial and caespitose, which is clumped and have absent rhizomes. The species leaf-sheaths are scabrous, tubular, keeled and are closed on one end. Peduncle is scabrous above. The panicles have filiform and pubescent pedicels which are hairy above. Florets are diminished at the apex.

Both low and upper glumes are oblong, scarious, yellow in colour, but are different in size. Also, both glumes have acute apexes. Palea have ciliolate keels and is 2-veined. Its sterile florets are barren, orbicular, and grow in a clump.

Ecology
It blooms only in August.

References

subflava
Endemic flora of China
Flora of Asia